Mohenjo-daro railway station is located in Mohenjo-daro, Sindh province, Pakistan.

See also
 List of railway stations in Pakistan
 Pakistan Railways

References

Railway stations in Larkana District
Railway stations on Kotri–Attock Railway Line (ML 2)